The following are the events in professional sumo during 1996.

Tournaments
Hatsu basho, Ryogoku Kokugikan, Tokyo, 7 January – 21 January
Haru basho, Osaka Prefectural Gymnasium, Osaka, 10 March – 24 March
Natsu basho, Ryogoku Kokugikan, Tokyo, 12 May – 26 May
Nagoya basho, Aichi Prefectural Gymnasium, Nagoya, 7 July – 21 July
Aki basho, Ryogoku Kokugikan, Tokyo, 8 September – 22 September
Kyushu basho, Fukuoka International Centre, Kyushu, 10 November – 24 November

News

January
Ozeki Takanonami wins his first top division yusho, defeating his yokozuna stablemate Takanohana in a playoff after both record 14–1 scores.  Takatoriki is third on 11–4 and wins the Fighting Spirit Prize, shared with Kenko and newcomer Tamakasuga. Sekiwake Kaio gets the Outstanding Performance Award. Rikio wins the juryo championship after a playoff with Wakahayato. Saganobori, a former maegashira who has been fighting in the unsalaried ranks for three years, retires.

March
Takanohana wins his 12th championship, finishing on 14–1, two wins ahead of his stablemate and brother Wakanohana and sekiwake Musoyama, who gets the Technique Award.  Asahiyutaka is the only man to beat Takanohana and wins the Outstanding Performance Award. Kotonowaka  wins eleven and the Fighting Spirit Award. Kyokushuzan wins the juryo yusho after a playoff with Saigo. Former ozeki Kirishima retires, as do former maegashira Owakamatsu and Tamakairiki (who has fallen to the jonidan division).

May

Takanohana wins with a 14–1 record again, two wins ahead of Wakanohana and Takanonami, underlining the dominance of Futagoyama stable. Yokozuna Akebono returns from three tournaments sidelined by injury to score 10–5. Tamakasuga wins the Technique Prize and Kaio the Outstanding Performance Award. Veteran former ozeki Konishiki avoids demotion and certain retirement by winning ten bouts from maegashira 14. Rikio wins his second juryo championship. The makushita yusho is won by Dejima.

July
At the Nagoya basho, Takanonami is eliminated from the yusho race on the final day when he is defeated by Kaio. The championship is decided in the final bout between Takanohana and Akebono, tied on 12–2. Takanohana wins to claim his 14th championship, while Akebono has his first runner-up performance since September 1995. Takatoriki wins his eighth Fighting Spirit Prize. Kaio and Kotonowaka share the Outstanding Performance Prize. The 95 kg Mainoumi is injured when the 275 kg Konishiki falls on his leg. He has to withdraw from the tournament, meaning he will fall to juryo. Daizen wins his second juryo championship. Former  maegashira Kiraiho retires. Kyokushuzan becomes the first wrestler from Mongolia to earn promotion to the top division.

September
Takanohana wins four consecutive championships for the first time. He finishes with an unbeaten 15–0 score (zensho-yusho), his fourth. Wakanohana, Takatoriki and Musashimaru all finish four wins behind on 11–4.  Takatoriki shares the Fighting Spirit Prize with Asahiyutaka. Kotonishiki wins ten bouts from the komusubi rank and receives his sixth Technique Prize. Tochiazuma wins the juryo championship, his fifth yusho in five different divisions. Former maegashira Kasugafuji, Hitachiryu and Kyokugozan all retire.

November
Takanohana misses the first tournament of his career after injuring his back on tour. In his absence Musashimaru wins his second championship in a five-way playoff after he, Wakanohana, Akebono, Takanonami, and Kaio all finish on 11–4. Kaio receives the Fighting Spirit Prize alongside newcomer Tochiazuma. Tosanoumi  wins the Outstanding Performance  Award. Tochinonada  wins the juryo title in his debut. Former komusubi Kyokudozan retires to become a politician in the Diet of Japan.

Deaths
4 Jan: Former maegashira Oedo, former Irumagawa Oyakata, aged 73. 
14 Jan: Former komusubi Ohikari, former Onomatsu Oyakata, aged 68. 
14 April: Former sekiwake Kotetsuyama, former Onaruto Oyakata, aged 53. 
8 Dec: Kagamiyama Oyakata, the former yokozuna Kashiwado, aged 58.

See also
Glossary of sumo terms
List of past sumo wrestlers
List of years in sumo
List of yokozuna

Sumo by year
Sumo